Sweden competed at the 2011 Summer Universiade in Shenzhen, China.

Archery

Athletics

Track & road events

Track events

Badminton

Basketball

Women's tournament

Preliminary round

|}

Quarter-final

Semi-final

Bronze medal game

Fencing

Judo

Shooting

Swimming

Table tennis

Taekwondo

Volleyball

Men's tournament

Preliminary round

|}

|}

Classification 9th–16th places

|}

Classification 13th–16th places

|}

Classification 15th–16th place

|}

Women's tournament

Preliminary round

|}

|}

Classification 9th–15th places

|}

Classification 13th–15th places

|}

Classification 13th–14th places

|}

References

Nations at the 2011 Summer Universiade
Univ
Sweden at the Summer Universiade